Every Day and Every Night is an EP by Nebraskan indie rock band Bright Eyes. It became the 30th release by Saddle Creek Records on November 1, 1999.

Conor Oberst references this album art in another of his songs, "Waste of Paint", from the album Lifted or The Story Is in the Soil, Keep Your Ear to the Ground. In the first verse he sings (that a friend, most likely Zack Nipper) "Once cut one of my nightmares out of paper; oh I thought it was beautiful, I put it on a record cover...".

Track listing
"A Line Allows Progress, a Circle Does Not" – 3:25
"A Perfect Sonnet" – 3:41
"On My Way to Work" – 4:10
"A New Arrangement" – 5:13
"Neely O'Hara" – 6:22

Track information
Neely O'Hara is a character from Valley of the Dolls, written by Jacqueline Susann.

Personnel
Conor Oberst – guitar, vocals, sampling, keyboards, bass, lyrics
Eric Bemberger – electric guitar
Tim Kasher – backing vocals
Joe Knapp – drums, percussion, vocals
Matt Maginn – bass
AJ Mogis – piano, loops, production
Mike Mogis – organ, pedal steel, vibraphone, keyboards, percussion, production
Angelina Mullikin – violin

Charts

References

External links
Every Day and Every Night at Saddle Creek Records

1999 EPs
Bright Eyes (band) EPs
Saddle Creek Records EPs
Albums produced by Mike Mogis